Bharat Kumar Kundra is an Indian actor, model, and anchor based in Mumbai and New Delhi, India. At the young age of 21, while still at college, he started his career in Media and Entertainment after winning prestigious title of Mr. India 2007. Bharat was also won the title of Mr. Photogenic at the same competition.

He is a qualified software engineer B.Tech. (Information Technology) from Guru Gobind Singh Indraprastha University, New Delhi. He received his high school education at Springdales school, Dhaula Kuan, New Delhi.

In 2014, he left his career in modelling and acting, to pursue a career in corporate communications and public relations with an emphasis in the technology industry.

Work
Kundra has worked with many national and international brands such as Hugo Boss, Tom Ford, Cornellani suitings, Puma, Armani, HSBC bank, Reebok, OCM, Octave, Samsung, Louis Phillpe, Close up, Godrej, TVS, UltraTech, British council, Liril, WangonR, Gaviskon, Crystal, and Kotak Mahindra.

He appeared in 'To Mohandas Karamchand Gandhi', a short film in which Kundra played the protagonist. The movie was featured at the Venice Film Festival in 2011.

Kundra was chosen as one of the global faces of HSBC bank in 2010 to represent India in Hong Kong.

He was shown on the covers of magazines like Men's Health, Travel n Leisure, India today, and Business Today.

Career
Kundra started his career by winning the title of Mr. India in 2007. On 31 March 2007, Kundra was named as the winner of the title by Priyanka chopra. He also won the title of Mr. Photogenic during that same event.

In 2010, Kundra was selected as the global face of HSBC bank and for a campaign shoot in Hong Kong.

In 2011, a short film titled 'To, Mohandas Karamchand Gandhi', in which Kundra played the protagonist, was selected to feature at the Venice film festival. The film is a love story set around the partition of India in 1947 and it won great reviews. Subsequently, Kundr was offered many roles in the Indian television and film industry.

Kundra played the role of 'King Bharat' in the stage adaptation of one of India's greatest India epics 'Ramayana'. The series was performed in a Broadway format and subsequently aired on LifeOK channel..

Kundra also played a pivotal role in a Police drama series called 'Shapath'.

Kundra also was very successfully in India's advertising, modeling and acting industry. For almost a decade he was one of the leading commercial advertising faces of the country.

After working in the media industry including advertising, fashion, films and TV, Bahrat started to pursue a career in the business side of the media Industry, and he started his own firm of Business and Management Consultancy.

Among his first clients was a Mumbai-based architecture and design firm responsible for the design of the homes of many Bollywood celebrities including Ranbir kapoor , Katrina Kaif, Hrithik Roshan.

NGO and social work

Snehalaya 
Snehalaya is a grassroots Indian NGO, based in Ahmadnagar, which supports Women & Children, and LGBT communities affected by poverty and the commercial sex industry. Snehalya helps to fight HIV/ AIDS and to end human trafficking.

Kundr has done a workshop on yoga, meditation, and public speaking working with children.

Brahmakumaris world spiritual organisation 
A global organization offering courses in meditation, positive thinking, leadership, rehabilitation and stress-free living. Promotes values–based model of modern health care, offering improved understanding in response to suffering and encouraging the development of positive thoughts and attitudes.

Kundr, being their Global Peace ambassador, has represented them at various schools, universities and rehab workshops conducting spiritual talks and lectures on meditation, positive thinking, and value based education.

In 2013, Workshop at Amity Institute of Psychology & Allied Sciences and Amity Institute of Behavioural (Health) & Allied Sciences on the occasion of World Mental Health Day

In 2014, 'Meditation and Corporate life' for working professional at the Global Co-operation house, London, U.K.

References

Male actors from New Delhi